is one of 24 wards of Osaka, Japan.

Higashiyodogawa-ku is located in the north-east part of Osaka city.

The population of Higashiyodogawa-ku is 181,535.(2003)

The popular area to shop is Awaji, which is about 10 minutes away from Umeda by train ride(Hankyu Railways Kyōto Main Line).

The cosmetic company Shiseido's main factory is in Komatsu, Higashiyodogawa-ku.

Economy

Company headquarters 

 Keyence - Higashinakajima

Transport

Train 

 West Japan Railway Company  (JR West)
 JR-Awaji Station
 Hankyu Railway
 Kyoto Line: Sōzenji Station - Awaji Station - Kami-Shinjō Station - Aikawa Station
 Senri Line: Kunijima Station - Awaji Station - Shimo-Shinjō Station
 Osaka Metro
 Imazatosuji Line: Itakano Station - Zuikō Yonchōme Station - Daidō-Toyosato Station

Education

Universities and colleges 

 Osaka University of Economics
 Osaka Seikei University
 Osaka Seikei College

Secondary schools 
 Osaka Seikei Girls' High School
 North Osaka Korean Elementary and Middle School (北大阪朝鮮初中級学校|北大阪朝鮮初中級学校・附属幼稚班; 기다오사까조선초중급학교・부속유치반). - a North Korean school

References

External links

Official website of Higashiyodogawa 
Official website of Higashiyodogawa 

 
Wards of Osaka